Bustillo del Páramo de Carrión is a municipality in the province of Palencia, Castile and León, Spain. At the 2004 census (INE), it had a population of 82.

References

Municipalities in the Province of Palencia